U Airlines was an airline based in Thailand, which began operations in April 2012. U Airlines operated only charter flights.

History 

U Airlines Co. Ltd. was founded in April 2012 . In August 2012, U Airlines received its first aircraft, an Airbus A320-200 and the inaugural flight was on September 16, 2012 with Bangkok-Yancheng route at Don Mueang International Airport.

Fleet 
As of August 2014, U Airlines has one Airbus320.

References 

Defunct airlines of Thailand
Airlines established in 2012
Airlines disestablished in 2014
Thai companies established in 2012
2014 disestablishments in Thailand